Confession Under Four Eyes (German: Geständnis unter vier Augen) is a 1954 West German crime drama film directed by André Michel and starring Hildegard Knef, Carl Raddatz and Ivan Desny. It was shot at Göttingen Studios and on location in Hamburg and a displaced persons camp near Nuremberg in Bavaria. The film's sets were designed by the art directors Ernst H. Albrecht and Paul Markwitz.

Cast
 Hildegard Knef as Hilde Schaumburg-Garden
 Carl Raddatz as Dr. Frigge
 Ivan Desny as 	Gregor Marmara
 Werner Hinz as Jorga
 Franz Schafheitlin as Chef Director, Dr. Kopp
 Stanislav Ledinek as Carol
 Ursula Grabley as Reporter
 Hans Christian Blech as Tscheche

References

Bibliography
 Broadbent, Philip & Hake, Sabine. Berlin Divided City, 1945-1989. Berghahn Books, 2010.

External links

1954 films
1954 crime films
1954 crime drama films
1954 drama films
German crime drama films
West German films
Films directed by André Michel
1950s German films
1950s German-language films
Films shot in Hamburg
Films shot at Göttingen Studios

de:Geständnis unter vier Augen